The 1991 Federation Cup was the 29th edition of the most important competition between national teams in women's tennis. The tournament was held at the Nottingham Tennis Centre in Nottingham, United Kingdom from 18–28 July. Spain defeated the United States in the final (in what was a rematch of the 1989 Federation Cup final), giving Spain its first title.

World Group Qualifying

Winning nations advanced to World Group, nations that lost in the first round played in consolation rounds.

World Group

Draw

World Group play-offs

The sixteen losing teams in the World Group first round ties played off against each other in the first round. The losing teams then went to play-off again, with those that lost twice being relegated to Zonal Competition in 1992.

Consolation Rounds

External links 
 1991 Fed Cup 

 
Billie Jean King Cups by year
Tennis tournaments in England
Sport in Nottingham
1991 in women's tennis
1991 in English tennis